Joseph John Johnston (born March 3, 1949) is a Canadian ice hockey coach and former professional player. Johnston played 331 games in the National Hockey League (NHL). Johnston was once a coach for the Douro Dukes of the Greater Metro Junior A Hockey League.

Born in Peterborough, Ontario, Canada, he played in the 1961 Quebec International Pee-Wee Hockey Tournament with his hometown youth team. He played junior hockey for the Peterborough Petes from 1964 to 1967. His play attracted the attention of the New York Rangers who selected him eighth in the 1966 Amateur Draft. He made his professional debut with the Rangers' American Hockey League affiliate Omaha Knights but was traded to the Minnesota North Stars in a trade for Dave Balon.

Johnston started his NHL career with the Minnesota North Stars in 1968, but spent most of his time in the minors until 1971–72, when he became a front-line player for the California Golden Seals.  His high-water mark came during the 1972–73 season through 1973–74 season, when for a Golden Seals team savaged by defections to the World Hockey Association he rose to the forefront, leading the team in goals both seasons with 27 and 28 respectively and being named to play in the NHL All-Star Game in 1973, 1974 and 1975.  As virtually the Seals' only star, he was named team captain in the fall of 1973.

However, his production in the 1974–75 season was half that of the year before, and he was traded to the Chicago Black Hawks in June 1975. In August of that year, Johnston was injured in a car crash. The injuries caused him to miss the Chicago training camp and the first 12 games of the season. His scoring touch deserted completely, managing only five assists in 32 games, and he finished the season in the minor leagues, retiring thereafter at the age of 27.

He finished his NHL career with 85 goals and 106 assists for 191 points in 331 games, adding 320 penalty minutes. He returned to Peterborough and took up coaching while working as a contractor. His brother Jim also played professional ice hockey, playing several seasons in the International Hockey League.

Career statistics

References

External links 

1949 births
California Golden Seals players
Canadian ice hockey forwards
Chicago Blackhawks players
Living people
Minnesota North Stars players
New York Rangers draft picks
Oakland Seals players
Sportspeople from Peterborough, Ontario